Edineț is a town and municipality in northern Moldova. It is the administrative center of the eponymous district. The town is located 201 km north of the national capital, Chișinău. The town administers two suburban villages, Alexăndreni and Gordineștii Noi. The population at the 2004 census was 17,292 inhabitants, including 15,624 in the town itself.

To the north of the town is the commune Hlinaia (Glina-Mare); to the south, the town of Cupcini; to the east, the commune of Ruseni; and to the west, the suburb of Alexăndreni.

History
The first known written mention of the locality is in a document from July 15, 1431, in which the Prince of Moldavia Alexandru cel Bun offered to Ivan Cupcici "14 villages with their old domains and empty land to found new villages and an apiary". According to the document, the old name of Edineț was Viadineți, possibly meaning "little Viadins". A document dating August 18, 1690, given by Prince Constantin Movilă to Cozma Pop, mentions the village as Iadineți. The name Edineț is documented since 1663, and is still used today. Between 1918–1940, the alternative spellings Edineți and Edinița were sometimes used. 

In 1812, the eastern part of Moldavia was annexed by the Russian Empire and became known as Governorate of Bessarabia.

Bessarabia proclaimed independence in January 1918 as the Moldavian Democratic Republic. In April 1918, Bessarabia proclaimed union with Romania.

At the 1930 census, there were three separately administered localities: Edineți-Târg (literally "Edineți-Fair"), population 5,910, Edineți-Sat ("Edineți-Village"), population 5,260, part of Plasa Briceni of the Hotin County, and Alexăndrenii-Noi, population 1,083, part of Plasa Rășcani of the Bălți County.

Between the two World Wars there was a Zionist Tarbut school in the town.

In 1940, the Soviet Union, with the consent of the Nazi Germany occupied Bessarabia, created the Moldavian SSR, closing privately owned businesses and religious schools.

A year later, the Romanian Army, now allied with Nazi Germany, drove the Soviets out and recovered Bessarabia. German and Romanian troops entered Edineț on July 5, 1941. Before that, some of the Bessarabian Jews of Edineț had already fled. Within two days, several hundred Jews were murdered by units of Einsatzkommando D and Romanian gendarmes, assisted by some civilians. Within the first two weeks, Romanian soldiers had killed about 1,000 Jews out of 5,000 living in the town. Many women and young girls were raped; some of them committed suicide. The victims were buried in three large ditches, then the Jewish gravediggers who had interred the bodies were in turn murdered and buried on the same spot. In the middle of August a ghetto was set up. Surviving Jews of Edineț, and others from different places in the north of Bessarabia and from Bukovina, were interned. In September there were about 12,000 Jews in the ghetto, crammed into a small area, suffering from malnutrition and disease. Dozens of people died every day, succumbing to disease, cold weather, hunger, or thirst. On September 16, 1941, all the remaining Jews were deported to Transnistria, where the majority of them died. By 1944 only a few managed to survive. The few dozen families still alive at the end of the war settled either in Czernovitz or moved to Israel. Only a handful chose to return to Edineț.

In 1944, the Soviets re-conquered Bessarabia and re-established the Moldavian SSR. During the Soviet time, the town was also known in the Russified versions Yedintsy and Yedintzi.

In 1960s, the Jewish population was estimated at about 200. There was no synagogue, although the Jewish cemetery still existed.

Following the dissolution of the Soviet Union in 1991, Moldova became an independent country.

Demographics 

1There is an ongoing controversy over whether Moldovans' self-identification constitutes an ethnic group distinct and apart from Romanians, or a subset. At the 2004 Moldovan Census, citizens could declare only one ethnic group. Consequently, one could not declare oneself both "Moldovan" and "Romanian". In the 1930 Romanian census, no one was registered as "Moldovan".

Culture
Edineț has a Natural History Museum, and a famous Museum of National Craftsmen, whose collection has many original folk objects and works.

Media
 Radio Chișinău 104.6 FM
 Jurnal FM 107.9 MHz 
 Radio Sanatatea

Notable people 
 Ghenadie Ciobanu
 Joseph Gaer
Revekka Galperina
Samuel Wainer

International relations

Twin towns – Sister cities 
Edineț is twinned with:

  Râmnicu Sărat, Romania

References

Further reading 
 Yedintsy (p. 425) at Miriam Weiner's Routes to Roots Foundation

External links 

 Edineț District Council
 Edineț based radio station
 
  Yad l'Yedinitz; memorial book for the Jewish community of Edineț, Bessarabia

Cities and towns in Moldova
Municipalities of Moldova
Moldova articles needing attention
Khotinsky Uyezd
Holocaust locations in Moldova
Edineț District